David Shaw was launched at Whitehaven in 1805. She quickly became a West Indiaman. Between 1817 and 1821 she made two voyages to New South Wales, returning from the second voyage via Batavia and Mauritius. She suffered a major maritime incident in 1822. Prior to 3 July 1826 her crew abandoned her at sea waterlogged.

Career
David Shaw first entered Lloyd's Register (LR) in 1806.

In 1806 David Shaw was already sailing to Jamaica. Between 21 and 23 August 1806 she survived a gale that caused a number of other vessels of the fleet returning from Jamaica to founder. She arrived back at Liverpool on 25 October.

In 1807 her master for at least one voyage to Jamaica was Wodall (or Woodhall) though that change did not appear in LR.

On 12 November 1815 David Shaw, master, came into Plymouth. She had been on a voyage from London to New York and had reached the American coast when she encountered very bad weather that resulted in her sustaining considerable damage. It was next reported that she would have to unload to repair.

David Shaw, Carr, master, sailed from England on 13 September 1817. She sailed via Madeira and Rio de Janeiro and arrived at Sydney on 9 February 1818, having brought a cargo of merchandise. On 21 May she sailed for England. David Shaw, Kerr, master, arrived off Dover in December.

On 10 June 1819 David Shaw, Jordain, master, sailed again for New South Wales. By October she had arrived at Hobart. On 16 November she arrived at Port Jackson. On 24 December David Shaw sailed for Calcutta via Batavia; she arrived at Batavia on 13 February 1820. On 4 July David Shaw, Jordain, master, sailed from Mauritius, bound for Batavia again. On 16 November she had returned to Mauritius from Batavia. She left Mauritius on 11 January 1821, arrived at St Helena on 17 February, and sailed for England the next day. On 30 April she was in the Downs.

She arrived at Quebec on 3 July. She was on her way from Quebec to Belfast when she ran on shore at Wexford. The next day she drifted to the east of Cork, waterlogged and without a rudder. After fruitless attempts at rescue, she was left adrift about 10 miles SSE of Old Head. Her crew refused to leave. On 22 September she was seen passing Castlehaven without anyone aboard. name=LL240922. HMRC Kite towed David Shaw into Crookhaven, County Cork on 25 September.

Captain Smith sailed David Scott to Campeachy.

Fate
On 3 July 1826 the transport Victory came upon David Shaw in the Atlantic Ocean. Her crew had abandoned David Scott; Victory believed that David Scott had struck an iceberg. David Shaw, of Liverpool, had been on her way from Pictou to Liverpool.

David Scott had struck an iceberg off the Newfoundland Banks and a falling spar had killed her master. Hope, sailing from Liverpool to Miramichi, picked up the crew. (This account gives the date of the accident as 23 July, which is inconsistent with the other accounts that state that David Scott had been abandoned prior to 3 July.)

Citations and references
Citations

References
 

1805 ships
Age of Sail merchant ships of England
Maritime incidents in June 1822
Maritime incidents in July 1826